Kersey may refer to:
Kersey (cloth), a coarse cloth

Places
Canada 
Kersey, Alberta
United Kingdom
Kersey, Suffolk, a village in England
United States
Kersey, Colorado
Kersey, Indiana
Kersey, Pennsylvania

People
Kersey (surname)
Kersey Coates (1823–1887), American businessman, developed Kansas City, Missouri
Kersey Graves (1813–1883), American skeptic, atheist and spiritualist

Characters
Kersey, a hare in the novel Rakkety Tam by Brian Jaques